Region One may refer to:
The Barima-Waini region of Guyana
Region One School District in Connecticut, USA
 Region 1 DVD